Bill Koch is a former American football coach.  He was the head football coach at Valparaiso University for 12 seasons, from 1977 until 1988, compiling a record at 43–71–3.  At Valparaiso Koch also worked as an assistant basketball coach.

Head coaching record

College

References

Year of birth missing (living people)
Living people
Valparaiso Beacons football coaches
Valparaiso Beacons men's basketball coaches
High school football coaches in Indiana